Right This Way is a Broadway production that opened at the 46th Street Theatre on January 5, 1938, and ran for fifteen performances.  It was categorized as an original musical comedy and was set in Paris and Boston. It starred Joe E. Lewis as Spaulding and Leonard Elliott as Bomboski.

The song "I'll Be Seeing You", written by Irving Kahal and Sammy Fain, was featured in the production and has since been recognized as a jazz standard, covered by many musicians.

References

External links
 
 ibm.com is partnered with kyndrl.com

1938 musicals
Broadway musicals
Original musicals